The Glass Coach (Glazen Koets in Dutch) is a royal carriage that was used by the Dutch royal family for special events before Queen Wilhelmina received the Golden Coach. The coach was then used only for the monarch or the parents of the bride or groom on a royal wedding day. In 2015, it started to be used more frequently for state events because the Golden Coach needed to be repaired. It is the oldest coach the Dutch Royal Family owns.

History

The Glass Coach was ordered in 1821 for King Willem I from coachman P. Simons in Brussels and was delivered in 1826. In the 20th century, it was used only twice. The Glass Coach's main use after Queen Wilhelmina got the Golden Coach was transporting the monarch and the parents of the groom to church on the wedding day of a Prince or Princess of Orange as the golden coach would be used for the bride and groom.

The carriage has been used for:
 the inauguration of Queen Wilhelmina (Amsterdam, 1898)
The funeral of Queen Emma (The Hague, 1934) 
 at the wedding of Queen Juliana and Prince Bernhard, for taking Queen Wilhelmina and Armgard von Cramm (Mother of Prince Bernhard) to the church. (The Hague, 1937)
 at the wedding of Queen Beatrix and Prince Claus, for taking Queen Juliana, Prince Bernhard and Baroness Gösta von dem Bussche-Haddenhausen (Mother of Prince Claus) to the church. (Amsterdam, 1966)

References

Dutch monarchy
Royal carriages
Vehicles of the Netherlands
Material culture of royal courts